Iowa Highway 22 (Iowa 22) is a  west–east state highway that traverses primarily rural areas in east-central Iowa. The highway begins near Thornburg at an intersection with Iowa Highway 21 and ends in southwestern Davenport, at U.S. Highway 61 Business.

Route description

Iowa Highway 22 begins west of Thornburg at Iowa Highway 21. It continues east through Keswick and Webster. Between Webster and South English, Iowa 22 is overlapped with Iowa Highway 149. It continues east from South English through Kinross and Wellman before intersecting Iowa Highway 1 at Kalona. It proceeds east from Kalona to go through Riverside and then intersects U.S. Highway 218 and Iowa Highway 27. After crossing the Iowa River, it goes through Nichols, where a short overlap with Iowa Highway 70 begins. It then continues eastward and intersects U.S. Highway 61 at Muscatine. It goes around the west and north city limits of Muscatine before intersecting Iowa Highway 38 and Business US 61 and turns south into Muscatine. It then turns east along a route next to the Mississippi River and passes through Buffalo before intersecting Interstate 280 at Davenport. It then turns north to end at U.S. 61.

To locals, Iowa Highway 22 is most notable as one of two main highways connecting Muscatine and Davenport (U.S. Highway 61 being the other). This  eastern section of highway follows the Mississippi River.

The segment of the highway between Muscatine and Davenport is part of the Great River Road.

History
Iowa Highway 22 was designated in 1926, and followed what is now U.S. Highway 61 between Muscatine and Davenport, passing through Blue Grass; U.S. 61 followed the Mississippi River route at the time. The highway was extended to Thornburg in 1931.

For years, several sections of Iowa Highway 22 was either gravel or had a bituminous surface. One of these sections — the section between Muscatine and Blue Grass — was paved in 1957, the same year U.S. 61 and Iowa Highway 22 switched routes; U.S. 61 now went through Blue Grass, while Iowa Highway 22 now followed the Mississippi River through Buffalo.

The last segment — between U.S. Highway 218 east of Riverside to Iowa Highway 405 north of Lone Tree, was upgraded from bituminous to paved in 1988.

Major intersections

References

022
022
22